"Behind Bars" is the first single released from Slick Rick's third album, Behind Bars. It was released on November 8, 1994 . The original version was produced by Prince Paul, but was scrapped for the album and single in favor of remixes by The Epitome of Scratch and Warren G. The single was released while Rick was still in jail and featured an entirely animated music video for the remix that was produced by Warren G (who also contributed a verse on one of his mixes); the music video was animated and directed by Sash Andranikian. "Behind Bars" became Slick Rick's first and only single to reach the Billboard Hot 100, peaking at 87 on the chart, the song also made it to 63 on the Hot R&B/Hip-Hop Songs and 12 on the Hot Rap Singles.

Single track listing

A-Side
"Behind Bars" (Dum Ditty Dum Mix) - 3:21 
"Behind Bars" (Dum Ditty Dum Mix) - 3:21 (Featuring Warren G)

B-Side
"Behind Bars" (LP Version) - 3:24 
"Behind Bars" (Dum Ditty Dum Instrumental) - 3:21

Charts

Weekly charts

References

1994 singles
Slick Rick songs
1994 songs
Def Jam Recordings singles
Song recordings produced by Prince Paul (producer)
Songs written by Slick Rick
Animated music videos